is a railway station on the northern Ōu Main Line in the town of Ōwani, Aomori Prefecture, Japan, operated by East Japan Railway Company (JR East).

Lines

Station layout
Nagamine Station has two opposed side platforms connected by a footbridge, with a small station building adjacent to Track 1.

Platforms

History
Nagamine Station was opened on December 1, 1952 as a station on the Japanese National Railways (JNR). It has been unattended since 1972. With the privatization of the JNR on April 1, 1987, it came under the operational control of JR East.

Surrounding area
 Nagamine Post Office

See also
 List of railway stations in Japan

References

External links

 

Stations of East Japan Railway Company
Railway stations in Aomori Prefecture
Ōu Main Line
Ōwani, Aomori
Railway stations in Japan opened in 1952